There have been three baronetcies created for persons with the surname Duncan, one in the Baronetage of Great Britain and two in the Baronetage of the United Kingdom. All three creations are extinct.

The Duncan Baronetcy, of Marylebone in the County of Middlesex, was created in the Baronetage of Great Britain on 9 August 1764 for William Duncan, physician-extraordinary to King George III. He was the uncle of Admiral Adam Duncan, 1st Viscount Duncan (see Earl of Camperdown). Duncan was childless and the title became extinct on his death in 1774.

The Duncan Baronetcy, of Horsforth Hall in the Parish of Guiseley in the West Riding of the County of York, was created in the Baronetage of the United Kingdom on 9 December 1905 for William Duncan. He had contested Pudsey as a Conservative in the 1885 general election, but lost to Briggs Priestley. The title became extinct on the death of the third Baronet in 1964.

The Duncan Baronetcy, of Jordanstone in the County of Perth, was created in the Baronetage of the United Kingdom on 24 July 1957 for James Duncan, Member of Parliament for Kensington North and Angus South. The title became extinct on his death in 1974.

Duncan baronets, of Marylebone (1764)
Sir William Duncan, 1st Baronet (c. 1715–1774)

Duncan baronets, of Horsforth Hall (1905)
Sir (Surr) William Duncan, 1st Baronet (1834–1908)
Sir Frederick William Duncan, 2nd Baronet (1859–1929)
Sir Charles Edgar Oliver Duncan, 3rd Baronet (1892–1964)

Duncan baronets, of Jordanstone (1957)
Sir James Alexander Lawson Duncan, 1st Baronet (1899–1974)

See also
Earl of Camperdown

References

Extinct baronetcies in the Baronetage of Great Britain
Extinct baronetcies in the Baronetage of the United Kingdom